Sandra Mariner (born 13 May 1974) is an Austrian luger who has competed since 1986. A natural track luger, she won two bronze medals in the women's singles event in 1996 and 2001.

References
FIL-Luge profile
Natural track World Championships results: 1979-2007
Official website

External links
 

1974 births
Living people
Austrian female lugers